Harry Gray (23 April 1916 – 3 February 1989) was an  Australian rules footballer who played with South Melbourne in the Victorian Football League (VFL).

Gray made his debut for South Melbourne in 1940, having previously been a member of the Melbourne Seconds squad but not being selected for a senior match at that club.

Gray served as a Flying Officer with the Royal Australian Air Force during World War Two.

Notes

External links 

1916 births
1989 deaths
Australian rules footballers from Victoria (Australia)
Sydney Swans players
Royal Australian Air Force personnel of World War II